Sekhat is a town in the Matiari District of Sindh province, Pakistan.

Populated places in Matiari District